Arhopala anella  is a species of butterfly belonging to the lycaenid family. It is found in  Southeast Asia (Peninsular Malaya, Sumatra and Borneo).

References

Arhopala
Butterflies described in 1895
Butterflies of Asia
Taxa named by Lionel de Nicéville